The women's javelin throw at the 1978 European Athletics Championships was held in Prague, then Czechoslovakia, at Stadion Evžena Rošického on 31 August and 1 September 1978.

Medalists

Results

Final
1 September

Qualification
31 August

Participation
According to an unofficial count, 16 athletes from 11 countries participated in the event.

 (2)
 (1)
 (3)
 (1)
 (1)
 (1)
 (1)
 (1)
 (2)
 (1)
 (2)

References

Javelin throw
Javelin throw at the European Athletics Championships
1978 in women's athletics